Byrne Creek Community School is a public high school in Burnaby, British Columbia and part of School District 41 in Burnaby. It is in the Edmonds area and serves over 1,000 students as of 2015.

Origin of the name  
The name Byrne Creek, for which the school is named, can be traced back to Peter Byrne—who served as reeve (mayor) from 1906 to 1910. 
The creek is a short distance west from the school. The creek has its origins just north-east of Edmonds station. The creek runs south through Byrne Creek Ravine Park (which has several trails for walking) in the Edmonds neighbourhood before joining the Fraser River in the Big Bend neighbourhood at Burnaby Fraser Foreshore Park.

History  
Byrne Creek officially opened in September 2005, being the most recently established secondary school in the Burnaby School District. It was built to accommodate for the rising population in the city of Burnaby. Most students who attended schools close to Byrne Creek's vicinity transferred out of their schools to attend the closer institution.

Layout  
The school is made up of three 'wings': A, B, and C—and two portables. The school consists of two gyms, one weight training room, several computer labs, one media arts lab, two foods rooms, a textiles room, two science labs, a dance studio, a band rehearsing room, a library, an atrium, a centre for dialogue, and nearly 60 classrooms.

Events 
One event that has become a tradition, despite the school's young age, is the Bulldog Bash, where all students celebrate the end of a successful school year.  Another event that is held for three days after school is the VPA (Visual Performance Arts) show. This performance allows the dance and art classes to showcase their hard work in a span of three days. 
The school's Leo Club also organizes annual events such as the Midnight Vigil and the 30-Hour Famine where students are given the opportunity to stay overnight for a good cause.

Awards 
In 2012, Byrne Creek was awarded the Whole Child Award by the international Association for Supervision and Curriculum Development.

References

External links
School website
 School Virtual Tour
School Reports - Ministry of Education
 Class Size
 Satisfaction Survey
 School Performance
 Skills Assessment

High schools in Burnaby
Educational institutions established in 2005
2005 establishments in British Columbia